The 2007 Speedway World Cup Event 1 was the first race of the 2007 Speedway World Cup season. It took place on July 14, 2007 in the Speedway Center in Vojens, Denmark.

Results

Heat details

References

See also 
 2007 Speedway World Cup
 motorcycle speedway

E1